On 3 October 2021, a Romanian private plane crashed into a building in San Donato Milanese, Lombardy, Italy. All eight occupants of the aircraft were killed, including the Romanian businessman and billionaire Dan Petrescu, the owner and pilot of the plane.

Incident 
At 13:03 CEST on 3 October 2021, a small private plane carrying two crew and six passengers departed Milan's Linate Airport destined for Olbia Costa Smeralda Airport on Sardinia, both locations being in Italy. At 13:12, it crashed into a building near San Donato station in San Donato Milanese, killing all eight on board.

Aircraft 

The aircraft was a Pilatus PC-12/47E carrying the registration YR-PDV. It was registered in Romania, and arrived in Milan from Romania on 30 September 2021.

Victims 
Eight people were killed during the crash: the Romanian businessman Dan Petrescu, his Romanian–French wife and their son; the others were a family of four: an Italian man, his French wife, their one-year-old child, and the child's Romanian–French maternal grandmother; and a Canadian man who was a mutual friend of both families.

Investigation 
On 12 November 2021, all data contained in the Lightweight Data Recorder (LDR) of the plane recovered after its wreck were successfully downloaded at the technological laboratories of the National Agency for the Safety of Flight (ANSV). In-depth and extensive analysis carried out by ANSV of the recovered data highlighted the unavailability of data about the flight or recordings referable to the flight that ended with the accident. In fact, from the maintenance documentation acquired by ANSV, it was discovered that the aforementioned LDR was inefficient even before the flight of the accident.

References

2021 disasters in Italy
21st century in Lombardy
Aviation accidents and incidents in 2021
Aviation accidents and incidents in Italy
Disasters in Lombardy
2021 airplane crash
October 2021 events in Italy